Sloanbaatar is a mammal genus that lived in Mongolia during the Upper Cretaceous. It lived at the same time as the dinosaurs. This animal was a member of the also extinct order  Multituberculata within the suborder Cimolodonta and the family Sloanbaataridae.

The genus Sloanbaatar was named by Kielan-Jaworowska, Z. in 1970. The name means "Sloan's hero", in honour of paleontologist R.E. Sloan.

Fossil remains of the only known species, Sloanbaatar mirabillis, have been found in the Coniacian - Santonian (Upper Cretaceous)-age strata of the Djadokhta Formation in Mongolia.

References 
 Kielan-Jaworowska (1970), "New Upper Cretaceous multituberculate genera from Bayn Dzak, Gobi Desert", Palaentologica Polonica 21, p.35-49.
 Kielan-Jaworowska, Z. & Hurum, J.H. (2001), "Phylogeny and Systematics of multituberculate mammals", Paleontology 44, p.389-429.
 Much of this information has been derived from  Mesozoic Mammals: Djadochtatherioidea, an Internet directory.

Cimolodonts
Cretaceous mammals
Extinct mammals of Asia
Taxa named by Zofia Kielan-Jaworowska